Steven James is the author of more than forty books, including the critically acclaimed Bowers Files, an eleven-book series of psychological thrillers that consists of Opening Moves, Every Crooked Path, Every Deadly Kiss, Every Wicked Man, The Pawn, The Rook,  The Knight, The Bishop, The Queen, The King, and Checkmate.  The series has received four Christy Awards and numerous other honors.

His latest book, Synapse, a standalone sci-fi thriller, released on October 8, 2019. The book received a Publishers Weekly starred review in July 2019 and a Library Journal starred review in October 2019. His latest nonfiction, The Art of the Tale, co-written with Fortune 50 speechwriter Tom Morrisey, released on August 30, 2022 through HarperCollins Leadership. Broker of Lies, his latest fiction novel, releases in April 2023.

Personal life 
Steven James was born in Wisconsin in 1969 and earned his M.A. in Storytelling at East Tennessee State University in 1997. He lives with his wife and three daughters in the foothills of the Smoky Mountains of eastern Tennessee.

The Bowers Files 
Steven James' most famous works to date form the psychological thriller series The Bowers Files. Each book delves into the life of Patrick Bowers, an Environmental Criminologist. Although each book is its own standalone story, they all tie together at various points. The crimes are gruesome and sadistic but presented without verbal profanity. Romance is shown, but without graphic sexuality.

Career 
Steven James is a nationally bestselling author whose award-winning novels continue to gain wide critical acclaim and a growing fan base. Best known for his psychological thrillers, he has received dozens of honors and awards for his books, including four Christy Awards. His novel Every Wicked Man won the 2018 International Book Award for best Mystery/Suspense.

Suspense Magazine, who named Steven's book The Bishop their Book of the Year, says that he “sets the new standard in suspense writing.” Publishers Weekly calls him a “master storyteller at the peak of his game” and RT Book Reviews promises that “the nail-biting suspense will rivet you.”

Equipped with a unique master's degree in Storytelling, Steven has taught writing and storytelling on four continents over the past two decades, speaking more than two thousand times at events spanning the globe.

Steven's groundbreaking book on the craft of fiction, Story Trumps Structure: How to Write Unforgettable Fiction by Breaking the Rules, won a 2015 Storytelling World Award and was recognized as one of the year's best resources for storytellers; his latest book on writing, Troubleshooting Your Novel, also won a Storytelling World Award. Both books were published by Writer's Digest Books.

Widely recognized for his storycrafting expertise, Steven has served for a number of years as a Master CraftFest instructor at ThrillerFest, North America's premier training event for suspense writers hosted by International Thriller Writers. Steven also regularly teaches Novel Writing Intensive retreats across the country with renowned international bestselling author Robert Dugoni.

Steven's short fiction has appeared in numerous publications including The New York Times.

Accolades 
 2020 entered into the Christy Award Hall of Fame
 2019 Christy Award for Mystery/Suspense/Thriller (Every Wicked Man)
 2018 International Book Award for best Mystery/Suspense (Every Wicked Man)
 2018 Storytelling World Award (Troubleshooting Your Novel)
 2015 Storytelling World Award (Story Trumps Structure)
 2012 ECPA Book of the Year - Fiction (The Queen)
 2012 Retailers Choice Awards Finalist (The Queen)
 2012 Christy Award - Suspense (The Queen)
 2012 International Thriller Award Finalist for Best Original Paperback (The Queen)
 2011 Library Journal's One of the Best Christian Fiction Books (The Queen)
 2011 Christy Award - Suspense (The Bishop)
 2011 INSPY Award - Mystery/Thriller (The Bishop)
 2011 INSPY Award - Thriller/Suspense (The Knight)
 2010 Suspense Magazine Book of the Year (The Bishop)
 2010 RT Book Reviews Best Inspirational Suspense (The Bishop)
 2010 The Christian Manifesto's Lime Award (The Bishop)
 2009 The Suspense Zone Book of the Month, November (The Knight)
 2009 Suspense Magazine Top 10 Books of (The Knight)
 2009 The Christian Manifesto's Lime Award – Best Fiction (The Knight)
 2009 Christy Award - Suspense (The Rook)
 2008 The Suspense Zone Reviewer's Choice Award (The Rook)
 2008 Best Crime Thriller Christy Award, Finalist (The Pawn)
 2007 A Peek At My Bookshelf (The Pawn)

Bibliography

The Bowers Files

The Jevin Banks Experience

The Blur Trilogy

Other Fiction

Nonfiction

References

External links 

 
Monthly Podcast

21st-century American novelists
Living people
American male novelists
21st-century American male writers
Year of birth missing (living people)